Euzophera magnolialis, the magnolia root borer, is a species of snout moth in the genus Euzophera. It was described by Hahn William Capps in 1964. It is found in the southern United States.

The wingspan is 34–41 mm.

The larvae feed on Magnolia grandiflora. The larvae bore the roots of their host plant.

References

Moths described in 1964
Phycitini
Moths of North America